Trevor Dandy is a gospel and funk musician. Born in Jamaica, Dandy emigrated to Toronto in the 1960s. His 1970 album Don't Cry Little Tree was produced by Paul Zaza's custom label Zaza Productions. The song Is There Any Love from Don't Cry Little Tree. was re-issued as a single-sided single by Chicago record label The Numero Group in 2010 in a limited pressing of 200 copies. The song has been sampled by Kid Cudi ("Is There Any Love"), Monsters of Folk ("Dear God"), The Roots ("Dear God 2.0") Ghostface Killah ("Drama"), Common ("Kingdom"), and B. Dolan ("Marvin").

References

Living people
Year of birth missing (living people)
Place of birth missing (living people)